Man from Frisco (1944) is a United States feature-length spy and war film by Republic Pictures directed by Robert Florey and starring Michael O'Shea (1906–1973) and Anne Shirley.

Plot

Matt Braddock is a civil engineer during the Second World War who has new ideas for shipbuilding. Braddock tries to establish yards for building prefabricated ships on the West Coast, but he is hindered by the former superintendent of the shipyard, Joel Kennedy.

A disappointed lover fails to deliver an important message on welds and it leads to the collapse of a new ship's superstructure and the death of a boy.

The subject of the film shows some degree of wartime propaganda.  The lead character is said to be based on the real-life Henry J. Kaiser, and the film is set in the Kaiser Shipyards.  Like the later Betrayal from the East (1945), Man from Frisco included actual radio reports of the negotiations with the Japanese before their attack on Pearl Harbor of December 7, 1941.

Cast

Michael O'Shea – Matt Braddock  
Anne Shirley – Diana Kennedy  
Gene Lockhart – Joel Kennedy  
Dan Duryea – Jim Benson  
Stephanie Bachelor – Ruth Warnecke  
Ray Walker – Johnny Rogers  
Tommy Bond – Russ Kennedy  
Robert Warwick – Bruce McRae  
Olin Howland – Eben Whelock (as Olin Howlin)  
Ann Shoemaker – Martha Kennedy  
Russell Simpson – Dr Hershey  
Stanley Andrews – Chief Campbell  
Forbes Murray – Maritime Commissioner  
Erville Alderson – Judge McLain

Notes

External links
Man from Frisco at imdb.com

1944 films
1940s English-language films
American black-and-white films
American spy films
World War II spy films
American World War II films
Republic Pictures films
Films directed by Robert Florey
American war films
1940s war films
1940s American films